Marlik is an ancient site near Roudbar in Gilan, in northern Iran. Marlik, also known as Cheragh-Ali Tepe is located in the valley of Gohar Rud (gem river), a tributary of Sepid Rud in Gilan Province in Northern Iran, Marlik.  Marlik is the site of a royal cemetery, and artifacts found at this site date back to 3,000 years ago. Some of the artifacts contain amazing workmanship with gold.
Marlik is named after the Amard people.

Marlik Cup 
Marlik Cup is a cup of pure gold and is 18 cm high. The height of the prominent designs of the cup reaches 2 cm.

Archeology
The mound at Mārlik is a rocky outcrop capped by several meters of sediment. It is surrounded by olive groves and fruit gardens owned and maintained by local villagers, overlooking rice paddies on the lower slopes of the valley. The site was already partly looted by  treasure hunters and the archaeology team were hindered by local corruption
 
A number of tombs were found. The initial Archaeology report concluded:
"In total, fifty-three tombs were discovered at Mārlik. The tombs were dug into the overlaying sediments of the mound, sometimes hitting and penetrating into the underlying bedrock. The tomb constructions vary from roughly dug pits lined with stone to fairly well-constructed examples with walls made from stone slabs bound together with mud mortar. The stone used in the tombs is mostly local, but in some tombs one could see yellowish slabs brought from the headwaters of the Gowharrud, some 15 km to the south. A few, evidently more important, tombs are entirely made of this imported stone, a potential indication to the social significance of the occupant. The tombs range in size from fairly small (1.5x1x1 m [Tomb 4]) to relatively large (7x4.5x2.5 m [Tomb 52]). Most tombs yielded very little or no large skeletal remains, perhaps a result of natural deterioration of organic material and rodent activity. In the handful of tombs, where partial skeletal remains where preserved, the body seemed to have been laid on its side on a large, flattened slab, surrounded by grave goods."

The archaeology is generally assumed to have belonged to a  people group who spoke an Iranian language and who migrated into Iran from Central Asia in early to mid-2nd millennium BCE. The abundance of arms, horse-trappings (as well as horse burials), and spouted vessels among the grave goods has been cited as distinct Iranian signatures (Kurochkin). The exact attribution of these people, however, remains largely a conjecture.

See also 
 Amardi

Gallery

References

G.N. Kurochkin, "Archeological search for the Near Eastern Aryans and the royal cemetery of Marlik in northern Iran", nnales Academiae Scientiarum Fennicae. Series B   ISSN 0066-2011, 1993, vol. 271 (1), pp. 389–395 (10 ref.) 

History of Gilan
Archaeological sites in Iran
History of Talysh
Iranian culture
Gilan Province